The women's beach volleyball competition at the 2015 European Games in Baku, Azerbaijan was held from 16 to 20 June 2015 at the Beach Arena.

Preliminary round

Pool A

|}

|}

Pool B

|}

|}

Pool C

|}

|}

Pool D

|}

|}

Pool E

|}

|}

Pool F

|}

|}

Pool G

|}

|}

Pool H

|}

|}

Knockout stage

Round of 24

|}

Round of 16

|}

Quarterfinals

|}

Semifinals

|}

Bronze medal game

|}

Final

|}

External links

Volleyball at the 2015 European Games
2015 in women's volleyball